Javier is the debut album of Javier Colon known as Javier. It was released on August 5, 2003, as a CD on Capitol Records. It reached #91 on the Billboard 200, the official American Albums Chart. The album is credited to Javier rather than the full name of the artist.

Track listing
Crazy 4:53 (Javier Colon, Evan Rogers, Carl Sturken)
Beautiful U R 3:46 (Colon, Harvey Mason Jr., D. Thomas)
Song For Your Tears 4:37 (Colon, Rogers, Sturken)
Slow Motion 3:58 (Colon, Mason Jr., Thomas, Nathan East, Barry Mann, A. & E. Dawkins)
Hey Little Sister 5:08 (Colon, Rogers, Sturken)
Biggest Mistake 4:05 (Colon, Mason Jr., Thomas, Tony Dixon)
Interlude #1 0:28
If I Never Get to Heaven 5:00 (Colon, Rogers, Sturken, R. Skies)
Can't Have My Heart 3:12 (Colon, Skies, Kevin Cloud)
She Spoke to Me 4:42 (Colon, Rogers, Sturken)
In Your Hands 3:03 (Colon, Cloud, Skies)
She'll Never Know 4:24 (Colon, Cloud, Skies)
Interlude #2 0:19
October Sky 7:06 (Colon, Rogers, Sturken)

Personnel
Javier Colon – vocals, piano, guitars, percussion
Tony Dixon – keyboards
Omar Edwards – organ
Eric D. Jackson, Michael Landau, Dean Parks, Michael Thompson – guitars
Carl Sturken – guitars, keyboards
Larry Campbell – pedal steel
Nathan East, Mike Elizondo – bass
?uestlove – drums, percussion
Karriem Riggins – programming
Charles Crawford – scratching
strings arranged & Conducted By Larry Gold
Charlie Bisharat, Darius Campo, Mario Diaz de Leon, Bruce Dukov, Olga Konopelsky, Emma Kummrow, Charlene Kwas, Sid Page, Charles Parker, Haim Shtrum, Gregory Teperman – violin
Davis A. Barnett, David Yang – viola
Dorothy Lawson – cello

Chart

References

External links
[ Billboard: Javier – Javier]

2003 debut albums
Albums produced by the Underdogs (production team)
Javier Colon albums